This is a list of libraries within the city limits of Istanbul.

Some of the most important libraries are:

 American Library (Amerikan Kütüphanesi), Tepebaşı
 Atatürk Library, Taksim
 Beyazıt State Library, Beyazıt
 Halide Edip Adıvar Library (Üsküdar American Academy), Bağlarbaşı
 Istanbul Celik Gulersoy Library (Çelik Gülersoy Kütüphanesi), Sultanahmet
 Istanbul Technical University Mustafa Inan Library
 Köprülü Library
 Library of the Archaeological Museum (Arkeoloji Müzesi Kütüphanesi), Sultanahmet
 Library of the French Institute, Beyoğlu
 Library of the Goethe Institute, Beyoğlu
 Library of the Islamic Research Center, ISAM (İslam Araştırmaları Merkezi), at Mayıs Üniversitesi in Bağlarbaşı
 Library of the Topkapı Palace (Topkapı Sarayı Kütüphanesi), Sultanahmet
 Library of Women's Works (Kadin Eserleri Kütüphanesi), Haliç 
 Nuruosmaniye Library, Eminönü
 Rami Library (Rami Kütüphanesi), 2023-established library housed in the18th-century built Rami Barracks.
 Süleymaniye Library (Süleymaniye Kütüphanesi), Beyazıt

Related lists
List of museums and monuments in Istanbul
List of urban centers in Istanbul
List of universities in Istanbul
List of schools in Istanbul
List of architectural structures in Istanbul

References 

Istanbul
Istanbul-related lists